West Bletchley is a district and civil parish that covers the western part of Bletchley, a constituent town of Milton Keynes in Buckinghamshire, England.  The parish consists of that part of Bletchley which is south of Standing Way/H8 (A421), west of the West Coast Main Line, and north of Water Eaton Brook. (The remainder of Bletchley is combined with Fenny Stratford to form the parish of Bletchley and Fenny Stratford).

Geography
West Bletchley contains three major districts with parish council wards within them. These wards/estates include:

Old Bletchley
 Church Green
Bletchley Park
 Poets

Far Bletchley
 Castles
 Fairways
 Racecourses
 Rivers
 Saints

West Bletchley
 Abbys
 Scotts
 Counties
 
Most districts of West Bletchley parish are residential, but the district of Bletchley Park is important enough to be summarised here.

City Council wards
West Bletchley is split between two electoral wards for representation to Milton Keynes City Council. Far Bletchley and the golf course area is in the Whaddon Ward (which, despite its name and proximity, does not include the village of Whaddon in the Buckinghamshire Council area); the remainder of the parish is in the Bletchley and Fenny Stratford ward.

Bletchley Park

Within the West Bletchley parish, in the Church Green district, is Bletchley Park. During the Second World War, this district was home to the Government Code and Cypher School. The German Enigma code was cracked here by, amongst others, Alan Turing. Another cipher machine was solved with the aid of early computing devices, known as a Colossus. Bletchley Park is now a museum, although many areas of the park grounds have been sold off for housing development.

Education

Primary
Children in the area attend a number of primary schools in the parish, which include: Milton Keynes Preparatory School, St. Thomas Aquinas Catholic Primary School, Holne Chase Primary School, White Spire School, Rickley Park Primary School and Chestnuts Primary School.

Special school
White Spire School, an all age (5-19) mixed special school for pupils with Moderate Learning Difficulties, is located on Rickley Lane in West Bletchley. All pupils at the school have a statement outlining their special need and are referred to the school by the Inclusion Division of Milton Keynes Council. As such there is no reserved area with pupils transported to the school from across Milton Keynes and, in some instances, further afield.

Secondary
 Lord Grey Academy, a comprehensive school

See also
 Bletchley and Fenny Stratford, the other civil parish for 'greater Bletchley'.

Further reading
 Edward Legg, Early History of Bletchley Park 1235–1937; Bletchley Park Trust Historic Guides series, No. 1, 1999

References

External links
West Bletchley Parish Council

Civil parishes in Buckinghamshire